Achères is a commune in the Yvelines department in north-central France.

The commune of Achères lies on the south bank of the Seine in a loop of the river, on the edge of the Forest of Saint-Germain-en-Laye. It borders Saint-Germain-en-Laye and Poissy on the south, Andrésy and Carrières-sous-Poissy on the west, Conflans-Sainte-Honorine and Herblay on the north, and Maisons-Laffitte and La Frette-sur-Seine on the east.

Inhabitants of Achères are called Achérois.

History

Land speed records

Gaston de Chasseloup-Laubat drove his electric powered Jeantaud, while Camille Jenatzy used the electric car, built by the :de: Compagnie Générale des Transports Automobiles (CITA), Nº 25, La Jamais Contente, the first purpose-designed land speed racer, and set the first record over 100 km/h (60 mph).

Population

Politics

Presidential Elections 2nd Round

Transport

By road, it is accessible from the N184, the Route de Poissy, and the D30.

Twin towns – sister cities

Achères is twinned with:
 Amarante, Portugal
 Großkrotzenburg, Germany
 Stonehaven, Scotland, United Kingdom

See also
Communes of the Yvelines department

References

External links

Official website 

Communes of Yvelines